Phi Epsilon Chi Fraternity  Fi Epsilon Cai is commonly known as La Phi Epsilon, is a Puerto Rican fraternity established at originally University of Puerto Rico at Mayagüez on September 26, 1943 by two women and seven male students of University of Puerto Rico at Mayagüez.

History
Phi Epsilon Chi was founded on September 26, 1943 by 15 male students at University of Puerto Rico at Mayagüez. The founding members are Bishop Dra. Myriam Visot and Celia Pérez Folch. The seven students were Carlos A. Flores Pagán, Pármenas E. Amaro Figueroa, Julio Hernández Fragoso, Alvaro Morales, José A. Pagán, Erving Flores Rodriguez and Ralph Dick Rovira.

Organization
The fraternity is composed of student chapters called Capitulos, Zones (Zonas) and Great Policy.

Notable members

See also
List of social fraternities and sororities

External links

Footnotes

Fraternities and sororities in Puerto Rico
1943 establishments in Puerto Rico
Student organizations established in 1943